Runt. The Ballad of Todd Rundgren is the second album by American singer-songwriter/musician Todd Rundgren, released in 1971. Like its predecessor, Runt, this album was credited to Rundgren's group Runt, despite Rundgren handling most of the musicianship and production himself.

Content
Most of the album's 12 tracks are piano-led ballads, with the only exceptions being the rock tunes "Bleeding" and "Parole" and the anthem "Chain Letter". As with his first album, this album was initially credited to "Runt". Rundgren himself wrote, arranged, and produced every tune on The Ballad of Todd Rundgren, as well as handling all the guitars, keyboards, and vocals.

"I was pretty overbearing to deal with," Rundgren recalled in the liner notes to the 1999 CD release. "I was also becoming very particular about arrangements, so I took a crack at playing it all myself. But I still had some dependence on other musicians. I wasn't yet ready to play drums or to seriously address what bass playing should be like."

Tony Sales, who played bass on Runt, the previous album, plays on the majority of tracks, but brother Hunt Sales, the drummer on the first album, plays drums only on one cut and conga on one. Studio musicians Jerry Scheff and John Guerin provide the rhythm section on two tracks; Norman D. Smart, who later became a member of the Hello People and was Mountain's first drummer, plays on the remainder. On two of the tracks, Rundgren is the only performer.

The album cover was designed by Milton Glaser. Inside photographs and design were by Ron Mael.

In mid-1971, Bearsville was purchased by Warner Bros. and plans were made to re-release both Runt and Runt. The Ballad of Todd Rundgren as a "twin pack" entitled Todd Rundgren's Rack Job (Catalog Number 2BV 2156) in 1973. The album got as far as test presses and album art, but was shelved as Rundgren preferred to release an album of new material.

Track listing
All songs written by Todd Rundgren.

Side one
"Long Flowing Robe" – 3:30
"The Ballad (Denny & Jean)" – 3:30
"Bleeding" – 4:05
"Wailing Wall" – 3:05
"The Range War" – 2:38
"Chain Letter" – 5:02

Side two
"A Long Time, A Long Way to Go" – 2:12
"Boat on the Charles" – 4:28
"Be Nice to Me" – 3:27
"Hope I'm Around" – 4:55
"Parole" – 4:22
"Remember Me" – 0:51

Personnel

(taken from inner gatefold of original 1971 vinyl)

Todd Rundgren – piano, organ, pump organ, Clavinet, Wurlitzer electric piano, EMS VCS 3, guitars, mandolin, fiddle, tenor and baritone saxophones, talk box, vibraphone, percussion, vocals
Tony Sales – bass (except on "Be Nice to Me" and "Hope I'm Around"), conga on "Long Flowing Robe", tambourine on "Long Flowing Robe" and "Boat on the Charles", vibraphone on "Boat on the Charles"
N. D. Smart – drums (except on "Be Nice to Me", "Hope I'm Around", and "Parole"), timbales on "Long Flowing Robe", maracas on "Boat on the Charles"
John Guerin – drums on "Be Nice to Me" and "Hope I'm Around"
Hunt Sales – drums on "Parole", conga on "Boat on the Charles"
Jerry Scheff – bass on "Be Nice to Me" and "Hope I'm Around"

Charts
Album

Singles

References

Todd Rundgren albums
1971 albums
Albums produced by Todd Rundgren
Bearsville Records albums
Rhino Records albums